Piggott Peninsula is a broad snow-covered peninsula between New Bedford Inlet and Wright Inlet on Lassiter Coast, Palmer Land, bounded to the west by Bryan Glacier and Swann Glacier. The feature was first seen from the air and photographed by the United States Antarctic Service (USAS) on December 30, 1940. It was mapped by United States Geological Survey (USGS) from surveys and U.S. Navy aerial photographs, 1961–67. Named by the United Kingdom Antarctic Place-Names Committee (UK-APC) in 1985 after William R. Piggott, British ionospheriscist and Head, Atmospheric Sciences Division, British Antarctic Survey (BAS), 1973–79.

References

Peninsulas of Palmer Land